Laurika Rauch,  (born 1 November 1950 in Cape Town) is a South African singer who performs in both Afrikaans and English. She had a hit single in 1979 with Kinders van die Wind (Children of the Wind), written by Koos du Plessis. The song featured prominently in the Afrikaans television series "Phoenix & Kie" in the late seventies.

Early life

Laurika was born in Cape Town on 1 November as the youngest child of Fritz and Rina Rauch. Her father was the public relations manager at Old Mutual until his retirement and her
mother was a trained social worker, the editor of Die Huisvrou magazine and was also very involved in charity work, especially amongst the elderly. She started playing the piano at the age of five, and sang alto in Oom Hannes Uys se Kindersangkring, a children’s choir from Pinelands, for 10 years.

Laurika matriculated at Jan van Riebeeck High School in Cape Town, studied drama at the University of Stellenbosch and obtained her degree in 1972. She moved to Gauteng in 1974 and became a household name in 1979 with the release of her first hit, Kinders van die wind. It was the first Afrikaans song in the late seventies to simultaneously reach the number one position on the Radio 5 and Springbok radio hit parades.

Career

She was an actress with PACT PLAYWORK in 1975-1976 under the leadership of Robin Malan. In the early eighties she also attracted attention with her interpretation of Jacques Brel’s music
with her performances in Taubie Kushlick’s two Jacques Brel productions at the Chelsea Theatre in Hillbrow.

In August 1996 Laurika performed with the Transvaal Philharmonic Orchestra (renamed NAPOP, now disbanded) in the Opera of the State Theatre in a program that consisted entirely of her repertoire. Both performances were sold out. Laurika has performed in Belgium, The Netherlands, Germany, London, the Czech Republic, New Zealand and Australia. In December 1993 she performed for an audience of 13 000 people in Utrecht, accompanied by the well-known Metropole Orchestra.

In March 1997 the Charles University in Prague invited her and her pianist (Fanie Fouché) to represent Afrikaans as the youngest member of the Dutch language group to an audience of academics from Europe and
Eastern Europe. The performances formed part of the Department of Neerlandistiek’s 75th Jubilee festivities at the university.

Laurika is married to Christopher Torr, the composer and writer of many of her hits, such as Stuur Groete aan Mannetjies Roux, Op Blouberg se Strand, Hot gates, Die Gang, Die mense op die Bus, My ou Tante Koba, Die Siener, Stille waters and many more. In 2011 Chris’s first musical - Stuur groete aan Mannetjies Roux - was staged. It played to more than 50 sold-out
performances in four main centres. The film titled Stuur groete aan Mannetjies Roux, which is based on the play, with Anna-Mart van der Merwe and Ian Roberts in lead roles, was released in 2013.

In September 2013 she toured to Australia and New Zealand. Laurika and her team visited and
performed in Auckland, Brisbane, Melbourne and Perth.

Laurika released her first album in 4 years, Wals, wals, Willemien in 2014, Die reis followed in October 2016 and Gunstelinge in October 2017. In 2018 she performed with Loki Rothman at the Festival voor het Afrikaans in Amsterdam. In 2019 se commemorated her 40 years in the music industry by releasing a limited edition (1000 copies) box set of 15 of her most loved albums, titled Laurika Rauch: 40 Jaar. Chris and Laurika have two children - Simon and Nina, and a first grandchild.

‘Encore! Brel’ and ‘Met permissie gesê’

After the success of ‘Kinders van die wind’ and her ‘Debuut’-album, the singer and songwriter Anton Goosen asked her in October 1979 to accompany him on a tour. At that time Goosen was also establishing a name for himself with his original Afrikaans music and his hit ‘Kruidjie-Roer-my-nie’. Before him it was often the case that German and other songs of foreign origin were translated and released in South Africa. Original local songwriters were few and far between. The tours did much to further establish Rauch's name.

Around this time the ‘grand dame’ of theatre, Taubie Kushlick, heard of Rauch. In 1980 she asked her for an audition as she was looking for somebody to interpret the music of the Belgian songwriter Jacques Brel in a new production with Ann Hamblin and Ferdie Uphof. Kushlick quickly decided that this "boeremeisie" (Afrikaner girl)– as she called Rauch – was the appropriate choice for her new production, ‘Encore! Brel’. It was a great success and played for six months in the Chelsea Theatre in Hillbrow. An ensuing production, ‘The Best of Brel’, followed in 1983.

In 1981 she was also in the cast of ‘Met permissie gesê’, written by Hennie Aucamp. " The show was the first Afrikaans cabaret."  With Janice Honeyman as director and people such as Amanda Strydom, Rina Nienaber, Gerben Kamper and Bill Curry in the cast, it was a form of "civilised protest" against the government of the day.

Christopher Torr develops as a songwriter

In 1984, English-speaking husband, Christopher Torr, wrote a song in English about the bank robber André Stander, who had obtained almost legendary notoriety in South Africa. The song was never recorded or performed.

When somebody gave Rauch a cassette recording of the music of the Udo Jürgens, she didn't listen to it at first, choosing to focus on original Afrikaans material, rather than translating foreign songs. Torr began listening to the German songs, and without knowing what the German meant, wrote Afrikaans words for one of the songs which was eventually recorded and released as one of Rauch's greatest hits –‘Op Blouberg se strand’. Torr still provides much of Rauch's most successful material.

Laurika Rauch as a songwriter

Rauch has put quite a few poems to music and recorded them, such as Nalekokers and Niks hang so rooi soos wingerdblaar by Hexrivier by Boerneef, Ballade vir ‘n koningsdogter by ID du Plessis and Windliedjie and Toemaar die donker man by Ingrid Jonker.

Career highlights and awards
Rauch received a ‘Sarie’ award in 1980 as most promising singer. She was the first recipient of a medal of honour awarded by the ‘South African Academy for Arts and Science’ for her contribution to light Afrikaans music in 1997. In 2006 ‘Huisgenoot Skouspel’ crowned her with an award for her lifelong achievement.

‘Van Berlyn tot Bapsfontein’, together with Jannie du Toit in 1988, was another highlight for her. Stephan Bouwer was the director of this singular production. 
She took part in Huisgenoot Skouspel in 2000 for the first time, with further performances in 2001, 2002, 2003, 2006, 2007, 2008 en 2009. She was also involved in the ‘Huisgenoot's Kaapse Jol’ in 2007, and ‘Skouspel Plus' in 2009 and 2010. There were various overseas performances, amongst them a concert tour to Belgium in 1985 (a documentary for television was also made during this tour), performances in the Netherlands in 1993 and 1994, three performances in London (2002–2004) at the Ukkasie festival, two performances in Prague (1997 and 1998) and a performance in Antwerp in 2006.

‘Samekoms/Kopano’ with Vusi Mahlasela in 1998/99 is another high point of her career. Rauch was producer and singer, and Deon Opperman the director.

In 2011 her husband, Christopher Torr, completed the musical theatre piece, Stuur groete aan Mannetjies Roux, and sold-out runs at the Atterbury Theatre in Pretoria, the Artscape in the Cape, Emperor's Palace in Johannesburg and the Sand du Plessis theatre in Bloemfontein, were completed at the end of July. Her most popular songs were used in the production, and Rauch also sang and acted in the show. The musical, with a cast of 12 actor/singers, surpassed all expectations – artistically and at the box office.

In 2016 she was awarded the Order of Ikhamanga for "her outstanding contribution in the field of music and raising awareness on political injustices through music."

Discography

‘Debuut’ (1979), ‘ ’n Jaar in my lewe’ (1980), ‘Vir Jou’ (1981), ‘Jy is te dierbaar’ (1983) ‘Laurika op versoek’ (1985) and ‘Encore! Laurika’ (1988):

These vinyl albums provided some of Rauch's greatest hits. Anton Goosen still provided many of the compositions on Debuut, with songs such as ‘Neanderdalman’ and ‘Vergeet om my te vergeet/onthou om te onthou’. Kupido, who would later achieve fame as a country singer, provided ‘Jy is te dierbaar’ and ‘Lied van die natuur’ on the 1983 album ‘Jy is te dierbaar’.
With ‘Encore!Laurika’ Chris Torr emerged on the scene as a songwriter with tracks such as ‘Miekie’ and ‘Die ballade van Jakob F de Beer’. It was actually ‘Op Blouberg se strand’ – his translation of the Udo Jürgens song – that was particularly popular with the public.

'Stuur groete aan Mannetjies Roux’ (1990), ‘Die gang’ (1992) and afterwards:

'Stuur groete aan Mannetjies Roux’ was her first Afrikaans album to reach platinum status, and it was the first female Afrikaans album ever to appear in South Africa as a CD. Chris Torr provided the title track about the legendary rugby player Mannetjies Roux.
Die gang was the first album that Rauch released in the name of her own record company, ‘Laurika Rauch Productions’.
The gripping title track of the ‘Hot Gates’ album of 1995 was also one of Torr's compositions. 
It remains one of Rauch's greatest hits. Rauch received a SAMA for this album. With The Brel Album (1997) she returned to her roots as a great interpreter of the music of Jacques Brel.

Although there have been other successful greatest hits compilations, her ‘19 Treffers van 21 jaar’ (1999) was a collection spanning more than 20 years of her career. This compilation has obtained double platinum status with sales of more than 120 000 and remains a good seller.

Gian Groen provided the title track of Vier Seisoene Kind (2002) and it remains one of her most popular songs.
My ou tante Koba (2004) was nominated for a SAMA. On her album Tweeduisend-en-tien! (2010), she performs a duet with Kurt Darren (‘Slang in die gras’) and the Robbie Wessels song Skouspel 2010, about a baboon that creates chaos in a hotel room, provides comic relief with the aid of baboon sounds provided by the musician Leon Ecroignard.
Her first and only full-length DVD of a performance, with Deon de Bruyn as director and Louis Brittz as musical director, appeared in 2006. The title is LAURIKA RAUCH: Grootste treffers LIVE.

Including compilations of her greatest hits, Rauch has released 22 albums.

Debuut (1979) – (Gold status) Arranged and directed by Dan Hill
'n Jaar in my lewe (1980) –  Arranged and directed by Dan Hill
Vir jou (1981) – Arranged and directed by Dan Hill
Jy is te dierbaar (1983) – (Gold status) Arranged and directed by Zane Cronjé
Laurika op versoek (1985) – compilation 
Encore! Laurika (1988) – (Gold status) Arranged and directed by Peter McLea
Stuur Groete aan Mannetjies Roux (1990) – (Platinum status) Arranged and directed by Peter McLea
Grootste Treffers Vol. 1 (1991) – (Gold status) Compilation
Die gang (1992) – Arranged and directed by Peter McLea
Hot gates (1995) – (Gold status) Arranged and directed by Peter McLea
Grootste treffers Vol.2 (1996) – Compilation
The Brel album (1997) – Arranged and directed by Peter McLea
19 Treffers van 21 Jaar (1999) – (Triple Platinum status) Compilation of hits until 1999
Die Mense op die bus (1999) – (Gold status) Arranged and directed by Marshall Harmse. The title track was the theme song of the popular Afrikaans TV series - Iemand om lief te hê
Hei Mevrou Brown (dit gaan goed) (2000) –  Arranged and directed by Jahn Beukes
Vier seisoene kind (2002) – Arranged and directed by Peter McLea
My ou tante Koba (2004) – Leon Ecroignard, Wouter van de Venter and Clinton Waring (her band members between 1998 and 2004) were the musical directors. Peter McLea managed the production and did the supporting arrangements.
Die nuwe trefferalbum (2004) – Compilation
Chris se trefferliedjies (2005) – Compilation of all Christopher Torr’s songs between 1988 en 2006
'n Lekker verlang liedjie (2007) – Arranged and directed by Louis Brittz
Tweeduisend-en-tien! (2010) – The album consisted of one CD with brand new songs plus a bonus CD with 11 previous songs. Arranged and directed by Peter McLea
Laurika Rauch sing die liedjies uit Stuur groete aan Mannetjies Roux (2011) - This compilation album also includes three new songs of Christopher Torr. Lulu van der Walt was the arranger and musical director of the three new tracks.
Wals, wals Willemien (2014) - This album was Laurika’s first featuring mainly original songs since Tweeduisend-en-tien!. The album was well-received and As ek eendag oud is and Murg en Been were placed on high rotation on all the important radio stations. Wals, wals Willemien reached gold status within three months of its release. Jaconell Mouton was main arranger and musical director, together with Juan (Floors) Oosthuizen.
Die reis (2016) - Juan (Floors) Oosthuizen – was die main arranger and Devereaux van der Hoven-Oosthuizen, Loki Rothman and Bittereinder also contributed as arrangers. Arnold Coleske was responsible for the musical direction, production and vocal production.
Gunstelinge (2017) - A compilation of some of Laurika’s favourite songs that she recorded between 2000 and 2017. A new version of Kyk hoe glinster die maan can also be heard on this compilation.
Laurika Rauch – 40 Jaar (Limited edition box set to commemorate her 40 years in the industry) (April 2019)

DVDs

Kom laat ons sing - 'n musikale reis van Laurika Rauch (2002) - A documentary on the development of Afrikaans songs from the 1930s until 2002. Laurika is the narrator and presenter and Johan Badenhorst the director. 6 Episodes. 
Laurika Rauch: Grootste Treffers LIVE (Gold Status) (2006) - This is a live recording of Laurika performing her best-known songs accompanied by a band. Louis Brittz is the musical arranger and Deon de Bruyn is the video director.
Stuur groete aan Mannetjies Roux (2013) - The film, released in December 2013. Laurika plays a character role and is responsible for all the vocals on the sound track.
Hart en See (2015) - With Elvis Blue - released in 2015. Huisgenoot is the media partner. Laurika an Elvis receive a Tempo-award in 2016 for best seller and DVD of the year and a Ghoema award in the same year for best DVD production for Hart en See.

Television performances

Fyn net van die Woord
Musiek en Liriek
In revue met ... Laurika Rauch
Debuut
Spies en Plessis
Potpourri
Teletreffers
Klub 88
Laurika in België
Lekker Ligte Liedjies
Kom kuier saam met Laurika Rauch
Middagvertoning
Platepraatjies
Hot Gates: 'n Dokumentêr
April 1980 (Film)
Noot vir Noot
Draadloos
Geraas
Kom Laat Ons Sing - 'n dokumentêr
Huisgenoot Skouspel (2000 - 2003; 2006 - 2009; 2012 - 2014)
Kyknet Fiëstas 2013
Kwêla 2014
Jam interview (2014)
Die Republiek van Zoid Afrika (2015)
Afrikaans is Groot (2015 - 2017)
For kykNET: Laurika takes part in a symposium about the entertainment industry, and the business aspect in particular (2016)
Adjudicates 2 episodes for Varsity Sing for kykNET (2016)
A Bravo interview (2016)
A Kliphard interview (2017)
A Bravo interview (2017)
Afrikaans is Groot 2015/2016/2017/2019
The Voice – Guest performance during 2019 the final show

Directing 
Laurika directs and compiles most of her solo performances, and has also been involved in the productions of other singers such as:

Performances

Personal life
She married Christopher Torr in 1984. At the time he was a lecturer in economics (later to become a professor). They have two children, Simon and Nina and a grandchild.

Awards

Sarie-award for the most promising singer (1980)
Dalro-nomination for the best performance in a musical for Taubie Kushlick’s Encore! Brel (1980)
Gallo-award for her performance in the musical Van Berlyn tot Bapsfontein (1988)
Octave-award for her album Stuur groete aan Mannetjies Roux (1990)
FAK-award for her sustained and exceptional promotion of Afrikaans songs (1995)
FNB/SAMA-award for Hot Gates (1996)
The first award of its kind by the South African Academy for Arts and Science for her contribution to light Afrikaans music. (1997)
Honorary-award from her high school, Jan van Riebeeck, in Cape Town (1997)
Standard Bank/SAMA nomination in the category BEST ADULT CONTEMPORARY ALBUM: Afrikaans, for Hei mevrou Brown (dit gaan goed). (1999)
GERAAS-award, sponsored by SABC 2 en PUKK, for her life-long contribution to South African music (2001)
Two Vonk-Oscars for: Life-long contribution to Afrikaans music and Album of the year – Die nuwe Trefferalbum (2004)
SAMA-nomination for best adult contemporary album for My ou Tante Koba (2004)
GERAAS-award for the best compilation album - Die nuwe Trefferalbum (2005)
Laurika is chosen as one of five Afrikaans icons (chosen by independent market research) as part of the ATKV’s media campaign for AFRIKAANS KOOK. (2005)
KANNA-nomination for PLAKBOEK (together with Amanda Strydom) (2005)
RAPPORT en CITY PRESS prestige-award (2005)
HUISGENOOT Life-long achievement award (2006)
An award from Dames Aktueel for her Contribution to Afrikaans music. (2009)
An award from the Gariep Arts festival, Kimberley, for her Outstanding contribution to the Arts in South Africa (2009).
An award from the organisation Want ons kan!/’Cause we can! For Years of Inspiration. (2012)
An award from Cultivaria for Exceptional Hits in Afrikaans (2012)
KANNA-award for the production Dorothy 60 jaar at the KKNK– Laurika performs with the legendary Dorothy Masuka, Karen Zoid and Zolani Mahola Directed by Carien Loubser. Musical director: Melissa van der Spuy.
Woordtrofee from the US Woordfees for Best contemporary Musical Production (Beste kontemporêre musiekproduksie) at the festival for Liedjies vir alle tye. She is accompanied by Llewellyn George (piano and musical director), Kenny Williams. (2014)
Laurika is the VLU’s (Vroue landbou Unie) artist of the year. (2014)
KANNA-nomination for ‘Hart en See’ at the KKNK. This is a duet production with Elvis Blue. Director: Deon Opperman and musical director: Janine Neethling. (2014)
The Clover-award for the Most popular production at Aardklop, for Nie as ek sing nie with Juan (Floors) Oosthuizen (guitar), Devereaux van der Hoven-Oosthuizen (piano and musical direction) and Vernette Rautenbach Wessels (backing vocals).(2015)
Versnit award in Recognition of her exceptional contribution to Afrikaans Culture. (Erkenning vir ‘n besondere bydrae tot die Afrikaanse Kultuurskat) (2015)
Ghoema- award for Best female contemporary album for Wals, wals Willemien. (2015)
Kyknet Fiësta-nomination for Best achievement in a musical production as well as a nomination for Best music-driven production both for Nie as ek sing nie. (2016)
A Gold status award from Coleske Artists for Sales in excess of 20,000 units for Wals, wals Willemien (2016)
Ghoema-award together with Elvis Blue, for Best DVD-production for Hart en See. (2016)
Tempo-award together with Elvis Blue, for Hart en See (DVD) as Top seller and DVD of the year. (2016)
FAK Prestige-award for a Lifetime’s contribution to the advancement of Afrikaans music. (2016)
An award of the order of Ikhamanga (bronze) from the Presidency.(2016)
A Ghoema-award for Ringtone of the year for ‘Blou’ with Loki Rothman. (2017)
Ghoema-award for Best female contemporary album of the year for ‘Die reis’.(2017)
Bokkie award for Lifetime achievement from Bokradio. (2017)
A Lifetime achievement award from Innibosfees – awarded jointly to her and her husband and collaborator/songwriter, Chris Torr (2019)
Laurika is inducted in the South African Hall of Fame for her contribution to the performing arts.(2019)

See also
List of Afrikaans singers
List of South African musicians
Music of South Africa

References

 https://maroelamedia.co.za/vermaak/musiek/laurika-rauch-die-musiek-ma-van-ons-menswees/

External links
 Laurika Rauch's Homepage

1950 births
Living people
Musicians from Cape Town
Afrikaner people
20th-century South African women singers
South African people of German descent
Afrikaans-language singers
Recipients of the Order of Ikhamanga
Alumni of Hoërskool Jan van Riebeeck
21st-century South African women singers